Ivor Roberts (19 July 1925 – 5 September 1999) was a British actor and a television continuity announcer who often appeared in comedic roles.

Born in Nottingham, he returned to acting following service in the Royal Navy during the Second World War. Roberts started his television career as a continuity announcer on regional television in Wales, working for TWW before that company lost its franchise in 1968.

Among his better-known roles were the characters of Arnold Thomas in the 1995-97 television series Oh, Doctor Beeching! and Mr Barnes in the second, third and fourth series of You Rang, M'Lord?. He also made a guest appearance, as a police officer, in one episode of George and Mildred. Another notable appearance was as Mr. Chick in Dombey and Son.
He also played parts in Porridge and Yes, Minister.

Roberts died in Cardiff, Wales, in 1999, at the age of 74.

Selected filmography

References

External links

1925 births
1999 deaths
20th-century English male actors
Actors from Nottingham
English male television actors
Radio and television announcers
Royal Navy personnel of World War II
Royal Navy sailors
Military personnel from Nottingham